Huevos a la mexicana is a popular breakfast dish in Mexican cuisine. It consists of roughly chopped tomatoes, green chili peppers (typically Jalapeño), and onions lightly fried in a hot skillet. Eggs are added and stirred until set. Refried beans are a common accompaniment.

See also
 Huevos rancheros
 Huevos motuleños
 List of breakfast foods

References
Bayless, Rick. Mexican Kitchen. (1996). .

Mexican cuisine
Egg dishes